El Fasher Airport , also known as Al Fashir Airport, is an airport serving El Fasher (Al Fashir), the capital city of the North Darfur state in Sudan.

United Nations peacekeeping force UNAMID uses a special terminal at El Fasher Airport for transportation.

Facilities

Airlines and destinations

El Fasher Air Base

The airport hosts a number of Sudanese Air Force units:

 Fighter (Close Air Support) Squadron (Sukhoi Su-25)
 Helicopter Squadron (Mil Mi-8, Mil Mi-24, Mil Mi-35)
 Transport Squadron (Antonov An-26)

References

External links
 

Airports in Sudan
North Darfur
Airfields of the United States Army Air Forces
Airfields of the United States Army Air Forces Air Transport Command in Central and South Africa
World War II airfields in Sudan